Vyakaranam can refer to:

Telugu grammar
Vyākaraṇa – Sanskrit grammar